Kaestneriella is a genus of stout barklice in the family Peripsocidae. There are about 13 described species in Kaestneriella.

Species
These 13 species belong to the genus Kaestneriella:

 Kaestneriella ecuatoriana Garcia Aldrete, 1989
 Kaestneriella fumosa (Banks, 1903)
 Kaestneriella guatemalensis Mockford & Wong, 1969
 Kaestneriella maculosa Mockford & Wong, 1969
 Kaestneriella mexicana Mockford & Wong, 1969
 Kaestneriella minor Mockford & Wong, 1969
 Kaestneriella obscura Mockford & Wong, 1969
 Kaestneriella occidentalis Mockford & Wong, 1969
 Kaestneriella pacifica Mockford & Wong, 1969
 Kaestneriella pilosa Roesler, 1943
 Kaestneriella setosa Mockford & Wong, 1969
 Kaestneriella similis Badonnel, 1986
 Kaestneriella tenebrosa Mockford & Sullivan, 1990

References

Peripsocidae
Articles created by Qbugbot